Lidköping is a locality and the seat of Lidköping Municipality in Västra Götaland County, Sweden. It had about 
40 000 inhabitants in 2021.

It is situated on the southern shore of Lake Vänern  and sometimes refers to itself as "Lidköping vid Vänern", to distinguish itself from Linköping near Sweden's east coast. Attempts have been made to change the official name to "Lidköping vid Vänern" but these attempts have not been successful.

Geography 
The town of Lidköping is divided by the Lidan River, flowing through the central city. The eastern side of it is called the old town, and the western side is known as the new town.

The municipality of Lidköping is, together with its eastern neighbor Götene, located on the Läckö-Kinnekulle peninsula. In association with several large local companies, they have a colloquial tourism company known as "Götene-Lidköping Vänern Turist AB".

History 
Lidköping got its charter on July 21, 1446, and thus qualifies as one of the now defunct Cities of Sweden. The city arms are almost as old. The design has varied throughout the centuries, but has always depicted a seated bishop. It is disputed if it depicts an actual bishop, but was in the 20th century decided to be a depiction of the bishop Saint Nicholas.

Around 1650, the city was incorporated into the countship of Jakob De la Gardie. However, in 1655 the crown decided to regain administration of the city. To make up the loss, De la Gardie was then given the right to found a new city on the western side of the river, starting in 1670. In 1672 the foundations were laid, and the new city grew quickly. In 1683, both sides of the city Lidköping were declared unified by the Crown, who also reclaimed possession of them both.

The old town burned down in 1849, and large parts of the new town were also damaged. Following the fire, both towns were rebuilt according to a check pattern.

Symbol
Lidköping is working hard to market itself as "Lidköping by Vänern". In line with this quest, they are developing a profile plan, wherein they have established the use of a symbol depicting its location by Vänern. The symbol is used in all official contexts, and also on the road sign when entering Lidköping.

Sport

Villa Lidköping BK has one of the best bandy teams in Sweden. Five times they have reached the finals of Elitserien. Sparbanken Lidköping Arena is the home venue. 
In 2019 they won the gold medal for the first time under the leadership of Johan Sixtensson.

Notable people

 Reorus Torkillus (1608–1643) priest of the Church of Sweden and the first Lutheran clergyman to settle in the USA
 Gunnar Wennerberg (1817–1901), Swedish poet, musician and politician.
 Mary Anderson (1872–1964) a Swedish-born American labour activist and an advocate for women in the workplace.
 Anders Järryd] (born 1961) a former professional tennis player
 Linda Sundblad (born 1981) a singer, actress and model.

Sport 
 Evy Palm (born 1942) a female long-distance athlete
 Daniel Nordmark (born 1988) a football player
 Timmy Hansen (born 1992) a racing driver
 Christoffer Ehn (born 1996) an ice hockey player
 Jacob Peterson (born 1999) an ice hockey player
 Rasmus Dahlin (born 2000) an ice hockey player

See also 
 Municipalities of Sweden
 Köping (concept)
 Lidköpings Mekaniska Verkstads

References 
 article Lidköping from Nordisk Familjebok (vol. 16, 1912)

External links 

 
 Läckö Kinnekulle - The "Götene-Lidköping Vänern" tourism company

 
Municipal seats of Västra Götaland County
Swedish municipal seats
Populated lakeshore places in Sweden
Populated places in Västra Götaland County
Populated places in Lidköping Municipality
Market towns in Sweden

ka:ლინჩეპინგი